The Hildegard von Bingen Prize for Journalism is an annual journalism award. Since 1995, it is awarded by the Board of Trustees of the Hildegard von Bingen Prize. Former award winners are members of the Board of Trustees. The award was founded in 1995 by the biographer and journalist . A publicist is honored "for an outstanding, professionally and culturally important journalistic individual achievement or a life's work." The prize money is €10,000. The prize is awarded in Mainz.  The award is named after the medieval abbess Hildegard von Bingen. The abbess was convinced that writing and word have their own effect.

Recipients

1995 
1996 Helmut Markwort
1997 Gabriele Krone-Schmalz
1998 
1999 Peter Scholl-Latour
2000 Joachim Fest
2001 Joachim Kaiser
2002 Sandra Maischberger
2003 Harald Schmidt
2004 Claus Kleber
2005 
2006 Maybrit Illner
2007 Giovanni di Lorenzo
2008 Henryk M. Broder
2009 Necla Kelek
2010 Fritz J. Raddatz
2011 
2012 Antonia Rados
2013 
2014 Denis Scheck
2015 Juli Zeh
2016 Ulrich Wilhelm
2017 Theo Koll
2018 Anja Reschke

References

External links
 

German journalism awards
Awards established in 1995
1995 establishments in Germany
Hildegard of Bingen